The Oberappellationsgericht der vier Freien Städte (High Court of Appeal of the Four Free Cities), since 1867 the Oberappellationsgericht der Freien Hansestädte (High Court of Appeal of the Free Hanseatic Cities), seated in Lübeck was an appeals court of the German Confederation and the North German Confederation with territorial jurisdiction for Bremen, Frankfurt, Hamburg and Lübeck. Frankfurt was removed from the court's jurisdiction in 1867 after its annexation by Prussia. In 1870 the court lost its subject-matter jurisdiction for commercial law to the Reichsoberhandelsgericht and was altogether abolished in 1879. The court was considered to be the most influential German court of its time due to its exemplary combination of theory and practice.

Establishment of the court (1806–1820) 
After the disintegration of the Holy Roman Empire the Oberappellationsgericht der vier Freien Städte was established as the third and last court of appeal in civil and criminal matters for the former free imperial cities Bremen, Frankfurt am Main, Hamburg and Lübeck, as well as Bergedorf.

The legal basis for the cort was Article 12 paragraph 3 of the German Federal Act of 1815 ("The four free cities are entitled to unite among themselves on the establishment of a common supreme court.") The inclusion of this paragraph in the Federal Act was an exception in favour of the Free Cities, which even together did not have the number of 300,000 "souls" that were in principle a prerequisite for the formation of a supreme court according to Article 12, paragraph 1. Because there was initially resistance to the establishment of a higher court, especially in Hamburg and Lübeck, in particular due to the feared loss of power of the senates vis-à-vis an independent judiciary, it took 14 years from the original initiative of Bremen in 1806 to its implementation.

Workings of the court from 1820 to 1879 
In 1820, the court began its operations. The court consisted of a president, normally 6 judges, a secretary and two registrars. The court initially initially had 8 and from 1831 six procurators. One of these procurators was Friedrich Crome from 1856.

Under its first president, Georg Arnold Heise – a co-founder of the German Historical School –, who presided over the court from 1820 until his death in Lübeck in 1851, the court gained a high reputation. With regard to him, Bernhard Windscheid expressed the view that the two highest honours for a jurist in Germany were to succeed Friedrich Carl von Savigny on his chair in Berlin or to take Heise's place in Lübeck. Through  in particular, the court had a considerable influence on the development of German commercial law.

Outside its jurisdiction, it was first chosen by Bavaria and Prussia and later also from time to time by other states as a court of arbitration in disputes between states. In addition, the court was responsible for examining aspiring jurists from the four cities.

The court's second president, Karl Georg von Wächter, was in office for just under a year from 1851 to 1852, until he returned to university.

Under the third and last president, Johann Friedrich Martin Kierulff, serving from 1852 until the court's dissolution in 1879, the court gained jurisdiction as the first and last instance for cases of high treason and treason against the state in the North German Confederation, but otherwise had to relinquish more and more competencies.

First of all, Frankfurt left the association on 1 January 1867 after losing its sovereignty due to the Prussian annexation, whereupon the name of the court was changed to Oberappellationsgericht der Freien Hansestädte for short. This was followed by the transfer of subject-matter jurisdiction for commercial law to the Reichsoberhandelsgericht in Leipzig and finally, with the reorganisation of the court constitution by the Reichsjustizgesetze, the court was dissolved on 30 September 1879. Proceedings were taken over by the Hanseatic Higher Regional Court in Hamburg or the Reichsgericht in Leipzig, depending on subject-matter jurisdiction.

Rudolf von Jhering in 1879 paid tribute to the court in an obituary of Agathon Wunderlich – a judge of the court who died in 1878 – and described it as the "as the learned court of Germany".

Successor courts and institutions 
The Hanseatisches Oberlandesgericht retained jurisdiction for Lübeck within the scope of its subject-matter jurisdiction (especially in civil law matters) until the abolition of Lübeck's statehood in 1937. Afterwards, Lübeck came under the jurisdiction of the Oberlandesgericht Kiel until the Schleswig-Holsteinisches Oberlandesgericht was formed after the Second World War. For Bremen, the Hanseatic Higher Regional Court in Hamburg retained jurisdiction responsible until the Hanseatisches Oberlandesgericht in Bremen was established in 1947. For appeals against judgments of the Prussian Court of Appeal in Frankfurt, the Preußisches Obertribunal in Berlin was the court of last instance after Frankfurt left the jurisdiction of the Oberappellationsgericht der vier Freien Städte. Since 1879, Frankfurt has also been the seat of a Higher Regional Court.

In 1890, as compensation for the loss of the Oberappellationsgericht der vier Freien Städte, Lübeck became the seat of the Hanseatic Insurance Institution (later the State Insurance Institution of the Hanseatic Cities), which was responsible for the disability and old-age insurance of employees in the three Hanseatic cities of Hamburg, Bremen and Lübeck due to the efforts of Senator Karl Peter Klügmann. This, too, went to Hamburg in 1937 with the loss of statehood through the Greater Hamburg Act.

Courthouse 
The court was or a short time based in Schüsselbuden No. 15 (Lübeck), then in Königstraße No. 21 (Lübeck), the former house of the Lübeck Zirkelgesellschaft.

After 1879 the courthouse was used by the Lübeck State Archives under the first state archivist Carl Friedrich Wehrmann. In 1936, the state archives passed it on to the public library, which gave it to the Katharineum, among others, after completing its extension buildings in Hundestraße.

The listed building was extensively renovated and converted into an education, meeting and memorial centre for the German Chancellor and Nobel Peace Prize laureate Willy Brandt, who was born in Lübeck. On 18 December 2007, the Federal Chancellor Willy Brandt Foundation opened the Willy Brandt House Lübeck as a branch office. The building was made available by the city free of charge and is used by both the foundation and the municipal office for the preservation of historical monuments. The renovation, which cost almost 2.8 million euros, was supported by the German Foundation for Monument Protection.

Judges of the court

Presidents of the court

Judges of the court

References

Sources

Further reading 
 
 
 .
 
 
 
 
 
 
 

Defunct courts
Legal history of Germany
Free City of Frankfurt
Courts in Germany
Courts and tribunals established in 1820
Courts and tribunals disestablished in 1879